Green Buffaloes Football Club is a Zambia Army-sponsored football team which was founded in 1965 as Zambian Army and later changed to Green Buffaloes FC. Green Buffaloes is one of the most successful club in the history of Zambian football and dominanted largely from the early '70s up to the late '90s.

The club is based in the capital city Lusaka, Zambia, that plays in the FAZ/MTN Super League, the top flight of Zambian football. It has won 5 League Cups, 4 Shield Challenge Cups, 3 Charity Shield Cups, 2 Heroes and Unit Cups, 3 Champions of Champions, 1 BP Challenge Cup, 1 Mosi Cup Champions and 1 Barclays Cup.

GBFC is among the four teams to have won three League trophies in succession. In 1975 Green Buffaloes won three trophies, winning the League, Champions of Champions and Shield Challenge Cup. The team later repeated the feat in 1979 by winning 3 trophies.

Honours

Performance in CAF competitions
CAF Confederation Cup

2006 – Preliminary Round
2010 – First Round
2017 – Preliminary Round
2018 – Preliminary Round

References
Home

External links
 

Football clubs in Zambia
Sport in Lusaka
Association football clubs established in 1965
Military association football clubs